Berceni, formerly known as Depoul IMGB (IMGB Depot, in English) is a metro station in Bucharest, Romania. It is the southern terminal station of Bucharest Metro Line M2 and it is the only aboveground metro station of Bucharest.

This station is in the suburbs of Bucharest, straddling the line between the capital city and the commune of Popești-Leordeni in Ilfov County. It was opened on 24 January 1986 as part of the inaugural section of the line, from Piața Unirii.

References

Bucharest Metro stations
Railway stations opened in 1986
1986 establishments in Romania